Central Tower (formerly FIM Tower and ORCO Tower) is a modernist office skyscraper located in the Ochota district of Warsaw, Poland. It is in close proximity to Warsaw Central Station. ORCO Tower is a landmark building, high B+ Class property constructed in 1995. The building has 26 floors and 14 400 m2 of high space.

Design 
The construction of the building have started in 1992. The designed was realized by Jacek Sokalski and Lorenzo Martinoia and the works have been completed in 1996. The architecture style of the building is modern, is composed by a higher central part alongside by shorter twins tower.

References

External links 

Skyscraper office buildings in Warsaw
Office buildings completed in 1996
Ochota